Embroidered binding, also referred to as needlework or textile binding, describes a book bound in textile, decorated with a design on both covers created for the individual book.

History
Embroidered bindings were produced by professional as well as amateur embroiderers or needle workers.

Examples of embroidered bookbindings are known throughout England and Europe from the 13th century to the present, and were most popular in England during the first half of the 17th century. These bindings were most often created for prayer books, Bibles, devotional texts, and as presentation copies for clergy or the Royal family.

Designs
Designs include flowers and foliage, sacred emblems or royal portraits, arabesque, heraldic, or figural elements. "The most common designs were Old Testament scenes featuring Adam and Eve, Moses and Aaron, Solomon and the Queen of Sheba, or David playing his harp, and New Testament scenes and figures of the saints. There were also allegorical figures, such as Peace and Plenty or Faith and Hope, flora and fauna, and heraldic subjects. The use of portraits came into fashion in the 17th century. Initials and coats of arms were added to personalize the work."

Materials
Materials utilized to create embroidered bindings included linen, colored silk or metallic thread, pearls and sequins used in decorating canvas, silk, velvet or brocade covers. "The cloth was embroidered separately before it was glued or stitched to the boards of a ready bound book; embroidered covers do not form part of the binding structure."

Image gallery

References

External links
 Embroidered bindings from "Hand Bookbindings: Plain and Simple to Grand and Glorious," exhibited at Princeton University's Firestone Library, November 10, 2002 through April 20, 2003
 Embroidered bindings from the Folger Shakespeare Library's Binding Images Database (mostly 17th century English)

Bookbinding
Embroidery